Marianne Alto is a Canadian politician, who has served as mayor of Victoria, British Columbia since November 3, 2022.

She was first elected to Victoria City Council in a by-election in November 2010, following the resignation of Sonya Chandler. The by-election took place on the same day as the city's referendum on the Johnson Street Bridge replacement project, which passed with 60 per cent support; Alto was the only candidate in the by-election who unequivocally supported the project. She was reelected to a full term on council in the 2011 British Columbia municipal elections, and served as chair of the council's housing committee. When the city's federal Member of Parliament Denise Savoie retired from politics in 2012, Alto was speculated as a potential New Democratic Party candidate in the resulting by-election, but declined to run.

She was reelected to council again in the 2014 British Columbia municipal elections. As one of the city's representatives to the Capital Regional District board, she was appointed chair of a special task force to work on improving municipal relations with local First Nations groups.

She was reelected to a third council term in the 2018 British Columbia municipal elections, but did not serve as a CRD board representative in her new term. She was elected mayor of the city in the 2022 British Columbia municipal elections, identifying housing issues in the city as one of her key priorities.

References

Mayors of Victoria, British Columbia
Women mayors of places in British Columbia
LGBT mayors of places in Canada
Lesbian politicians
21st-century Canadian politicians
21st-century Canadian women politicians
Living people
Year of birth missing (living people)
21st-century Canadian LGBT people